Sir Thomas Overbury (baptized 1581 – 14 September 1613) was an English poet and essayist, also known for being the victim of a murder which led to a scandalous trial. His poem A Wife (also referred to as The Wife), which depicted the virtues that a young man should demand of a woman, played a large role in the events that precipitated his murder.

Background
Thomas Overbury was born near Ilmington in Warwickshire, a son of the marriage of Nicholas Overbury, of Bourton-on-the-Hill, Gloucester, and Mary Palmer. In the autumn of 1595 he became a gentleman commoner of Queen's College, Oxford. He took his degree of BA in 1598, by which time he had already been admitted to study law in the Middle Temple in London. He soon found favour with Sir Robert Cecil, travelled on the Continent, and began to enjoy a reputation for an accomplished mind and free manners.

Robert Carr

About 1601, whilst on holiday in Edinburgh, he met Robert Carr, then an obscure page to the Earl of Dunbar. A great friendship was struck up between the two youths, and they came up to London together. Carr's early history is obscure, and it is probable that Overbury secured an introduction to court before his young associate contrived to do so. At all events, when Carr attracted the attention of James I in 1606 by breaking his leg in the tilt-yard, Overbury had for some time been servitor-in-ordinary to the king.

Knighted by James in June 1608, from October 1608 to August 1609, he traveled in the Netherlands and France, staying in Antwerp and Paris; he spent at least some of this time with his contemporary and Puritan theologian, Francis Rous.

Upon his return he began following Carr's fortunes very closely. When the latter was made Viscount Rochester in 1610, the intimacy seems to have been sustained. With Overbury's aid, the young Carr caught the eye of the King, and soon became his favourite  and his lover. Overbury had the wisdom and Carr had the king's ear into which to pour it. The combination took Carr swiftly up the ladder of power. Soon he was the most powerful man in England next to Robert Cecil.

Court intrigues and death

After the death of Cecil in 1612, the Howard party, consisting of Henry Howard, Thomas Howard, his son-in-law Lord Knollys, and Charles Howard, along with Sir Thomas Lake, moved to take control of much of the government and its patronage. The powerful Carr, unfitted for the responsibilities thrust upon him and often dependent on his intimate friend, Overbury, for assistance with government papers, fell into the Howard camp, after beginning an affair with the married Frances Howard, Countess of Essex, daughter of the Earl of Suffolk.

Overbury was from the first violently opposed to the affair, pointing out to Carr that it would be hurtful to his preferment, and that Frances Howard, even at this early stage in her career, was already "noted for her injury and immodesty." But Carr was now infatuated, and he repeated to the Countess what Overbury had said. It was at this time, too, that Overbury wrote, and circulated widely in manuscript his poem A Wife, which was a picture of the virtues which a young man should demand in a woman before he has the rashness to marry her. Lady Essex believed that Overbury's object in writing this poem was to open the eyes of his friend to her defects. The situation now turned into a deadly duel between the mistress and the friend. The Countess tried to manipulate Overbury into seeming to be disrespectful to the queen, Anne of Denmark who took offence. Her chamberlain, Viscount Lisle, wrote in November 1612 that Overbury was allowed to come to court, but not in the queen's sight, or into her side of the royal lodgings.

James I offered Overbury an assignment as ambassador, probably to the court of Michael of Russia, relations with Russia being at that time a potential issue between those who favoured a strongly pro-Protestant and anti-Catholic foreign policy, and those, centred around the Howards, who favoured accommodation with Catholic powers on the Continent; there were political reasons of international policy as well as personal ones involving the King's jealousy of Overbury's relationship with Carr, to persuade James to send the former away and also a private interest for Carr and Northampton to urge the offer upon him. Overbury declined, possibly because he felt tricked into it by Carr (precisely because refusing would ensure that Overbury would be imprisoned), possibly because Overbury sensed the urgency to remain in England and at his friend's side. James I was so irate at Overbury's arrogance in declining the offer that he had him thrown into the Tower of London on 22 April 1613, where he died on 14 September.

Beginnings of scandal

The Howards won James's support for an annulment of Frances's marriage to Robert Devereux, 3rd Earl of Essex, on grounds of impotence, to free her to remarry.  With James's assistance, the marriage was duly annulled on 25 September 1613, despite Essex's opposition to the charge of impotence. The commissioners judging the case reached a 5–5 verdict, so James quickly appointed two extra judges guaranteed to vote in favour, an intervention which aroused public censure. When, after the annulment, Thomas Bilson (son of Thomas Bilson, Bishop of Winchester, one of the added commissioners) was knighted, he was given the nickname "Sir Nullity Bilson". There were also rumours that the commission was tricked into believing that Frances was still virgo intacta.

The marriage two months later of Frances Howard and Robert Carr, now the Earl of Somerset, was the court event of the season, celebrated in verse by John Donne. The Howards' rise to power seemed complete.

Rumours of foul play in Overbury's death began circulating. Almost two years later, in September 1615, and as James was in the process of replacing Carr with new favourite George Villiers, the governor of the Tower sent a letter to the King, informing him that one of the warders had been bringing the prisoner "poisoned food and medicine." 

James showed a disinclination to delve into the matter, but the rumours refused to go away. Eventually, they began hinting at the King's own involvement, forcing him to order an investigation. The details of the murder were uncovered by Edward Coke and Sir Francis Bacon who presided over the trial.

Trial

 In the celebrated trials of the six accused in late 1615 and early 1616 that followed, evidence of a plot came to light. It was very likely that Overbury was the victim of a 'set-up' contrived by the Earls of Northampton and Suffolk, with Carr's complicity, to keep him out of the way during the annulment proceedings. Overbury knew too much of Carr's dealings with Frances and, motivated by a deep political hostility to the Howards, opposed the match with a fervour that made him dangerous. The Queen had sown discord between the friends, calling Overbury Carr's "governor".

It was not known at the time, and it is not certain now, how much Carr participated in the first crime, or if he was ignorant of it. Lady Essex, however, was not satisfied with having had Overbury shut up; she was determined that "he should return no more to this stage." She had Sir William Wade, the honest Lord Lieutenant of the Tower, removed to make way for a new Lieutenant, Sir Gervase Helwys; and a gaoler, Richard Weston, of whom it was ominously said that he was "a man well acquainted with the power of drugs," was set to attend on Overbury. Weston, afterwards aided by Mrs Anne Turner, the widow of a physician, and by an apothecary called Franklin, plied Overbury with sulfuric acid in the form of copper vitriol.

It cannot have been difficult for the conspirators to secure James's compliance because he disliked Overbury's influence over Carr. John Chamberlain (1553–1628) reported at the time that the King "hath long had a desire to remove him from about the lord of Rochester [Carr], as thinking it a dishonour to him that the world should have an opinion that Rochester ruled him and Overbury ruled Rochester". Overbury had been poisoned.

Frances Howard admitted a part in Overbury's murder, but her husband did not. Fearing what Carr might say about him in court, James repeatedly sent messages to the Tower pleading with him to admit his guilt in return for a pardon. "It is easy to be seen that he would threaten me with laying an aspersion upon me of being, in some sort, accessory to his crime".

In late May 1616, the couple were found guilty and sentenced to death for their parts in this conspiracy. Nevertheless, they remained prisoners in the Tower until eventually released in 1622 and pardoned.

Four accomplices – Richard Weston, Anne Turner, Gervaise Helwys, and Simon Franklin – were found guilty prior to that in 1615 and, lacking powerful connections, were hanged.

The implication of the King in such a scandal provoked much public and literary conjecture and irreparably tarnished James's court with an image of corruption and depravity.

Literary and cultural references

Overbury's poem, A Wife, was published in 1614 (see 1614 in poetry), and ran through six editions within a year, the scandal connected with the murder of the author greatly aiding its success. It was abundantly reprinted within the next sixty years, and it continued to be one of the most widely popular books of the 17th century. Combined with later editions of A Wife, and gradually adding to its bulk, were Characters (first printed in the second of the 1614 editions), The Remedy of Love (1620; see 1620 in poetry), and Observations in Foreign Travels (1626). Later, much that must be spurious was added to the gathering snowball of Overbury's works.
Hic Mulier, an anonymous pamphlet published in 1620 in opposition to 'masculine' behaviour in females during the reign of James VI and I, quotes from A Wife, identified only through a marginal reference to S.T.O.
The Court and Character of King James, a gossipy and partisan memoir, published in 1650 by a longstanding courtier, Sir Anthony Weldon
Tragic stage play, Sir Thomas Overbury, by Richard Savage 1723
Jean Plaidy's Murder in the Tower in 1964 tells of the love triangle between Overbury, Carr and Lady Francis Howard.
For an alternative account of the trial, see Anne Somerset's Unnatural Murder (Weidenfeld & Nicolson, 1997).
Marjorie Bowen wrote a fictionalised account of the case and trial in The King's Favourite.
Rafael Sabatini's novel about the rise and fall of Robert Carr, The King's Minion (1930), argues Overbury's poisoning was ordered by James I and carried out by his personal physician after the failed attempts by Lady Essex and her conspirators.
The dramatist John Ford wrote a lost work titled Sir Thomas Overbury's Ghost, containing the history of his life and untimely death (1615). Its nature is uncertain, but Ford scholars have suggested it may have been an elegy, prose piece or pamphlet.
Nathaniel Hawthorne mentions this murder in his book The Scarlet Letter.
Charles Mackay devoted much of the chapter on "The Slow Poisoners" in the second volume of Extraordinary Popular Delusions and the Madness of Crowds to Overbury's death and the various fates of his murderers.
Miriam Allen deFord wrote The Overbury Affair, which involves events during the reign of James I of Britain surrounding the murder of Sir Thomas Overbury. For the latter work she received a 1961 Edgar Award from the Mystery Writers of America for Best Fact Crime book.
Brian Harris QC offers a radical new approach to the poisoning conspiracy and suggests that Overbury may not have died  at the hands of Frances Howard. See Passion, Poison and Power, Wildy, Simmonds & Hill, 2010;
A recent (2018) fictional treatment of the story is The Poison Bed by Elizabeth Fremantle (writing as E.C. Fremantle)
 “A Net for Small Fishes” Lucy Jago (Bloomsbury 2021) is a highly praised fictional account, focusing on Frances Howard and Anne Turner’s relationship

See also
 The Cobbe portrait, frequently cited as one of a very few portraits of William Shakespeare, is believed by several scholars to instead to be a portrait of Overbury.

Notes

References
Barroll, J. Leeds (2001) Anna of Denmark, Queen of England: a cultural biography. Philadelphia: University of Pennsylvania Press .
Davies, Godfrey ([1937] 1959) The Early Stuarts. Oxford: Clarendon Press .
DeFord, Miriam Allen (1960) The Overbury Affair: the murder trial that rocked the court of King James I. Philadelphia: Chilton Company.
Harris, Brian (2010 ) Passion, Poison and Power: The Mysterious Death of Sir Thomas Overbury Wildy, Simmonds and Hill. .
Lindley, David (1993) The Trials of Frances Howard: fact and fiction at the court of King James. London: Routledge .
 
Perry, Curtis (2006) Literature and Favoritism in Early Modern England. Cambridge; New York: Cambridge University Press .
Stewart, Alan (2003) The Cradle King: a life of James VI & I. London: Chatto and Windus. .
Willson, David Harris ([1956] 1963 ed) King James VI & I. London: Jonathan Cape .

External links
 The tryal of Mr. Richard Weston, at the Guild-Hall of the City of London, for the murder of Sir Thomas Overbury, Knt. October the 19th, 1615. 13 Jac. I, 1737 (unknown author, publisher)

17th-century English poets
17th-century male writers
English essayists
English knights
1581 births
1613 deaths
People from Stratford-on-Avon District
Alumni of The Queen's College, Oxford
English murder victims
People murdered in England
Prisoners in the Tower of London
16th-century English poets
Male essayists
English male poets